Mireuksan  is a mountain in the city of Wonju, Gangwon-do in South Korea.

See also
 List of mountains in Korea

Notes

References
 

Mountains of Gangwon Province, South Korea
Wonju
Mountains of South Korea
One-thousanders of South Korea